Fabian Adrian Himcinschi (born 12 May 1994) is a Romanian footballer who plays as a striker for fifth tier side CSU Alba Iulia.  His father, Adorian Himcinschi was also a footballer.

References

External links
 
 

1994 births
Living people
Sportspeople from Alba Iulia
Romanian footballers
Association football forwards
Romania youth international footballers
Romania under-21 international footballers
Liga I players
Liga II players
CSM Unirea Alba Iulia players
Empoli F.C. players
ACS Poli Timișoara players
SCM Râmnicu Vâlcea players
FC Dinamo București players
FC Dunărea Călărași players
CSM Reșița players
Romanian expatriate footballers
Expatriate footballers in Italy
Romanian expatriate sportspeople in Italy